Alexander Zaim (born April 21, 1988) is a Swedish football player. He has previously played for Helsingborgs IF, Åtvidabergs FF, Landskrona BoIS, Nybergsund IL-Trysil and Eskilsminne IF.

External links 
 
 
 

Swedish footballers
Åtvidabergs FF players
Helsingborgs IF players
Landskrona BoIS players
1988 births
Living people
Expatriate footballers in Norway
Association football midfielders
Sportspeople from Helsingborg